Asha Bhosle is an Indian playback singer, entrepreneur
and occasional actress and television personality who predominantly works in Indian Cinema. Known for her versatility, she has been described in the media as one of the most influential and successful singers in Hindi Cinema. In her career spanning over eight decades she has recorded songs for films and albums in various Indian languages and received several accolades including two National Film Awards, four BFJA Awards, eighteen Maharashtra State Film Awards, nine Filmfare Awards including a Lifetime Achievement Award and a record seven Filmfare Awards for Best Female Playback Singer, in addition to two Grammy nominations. In 2000, she was honoured with the Dadasaheb Phalke Award, India's highest award in the field of cinema. In 2008, she was honoured by the Government of India with the Padma Vibhushan, the second-highest civilian honour of the country. Additionally she holds the Guinness World Record for the most studio recordings - singles. The following is a complete list of her songs in various Indian languages:

Hindi songs

Bengali songs

Marathi songs

Tamil songs

Telugu songs

Kannada songs

Malayalam songs

Gujarati songs

Oriya songs

Punjabi songs

Non-film songs

Assamese non-film songs

Bhojpuri songs

Non-film songs

Russian songs

Non-film songs

Notes

References

Bhosle, Asha